Juan Carlos Porras (born July 8, 1997) is an American politician serving as a member of the Florida House of Representatives for the 119th district. He assumed office on November 8, 2022.

Early life and education 
Porras was born in Miami in 1997. He earned a Bachelor of Arts degree in political science from Florida International University.

Career 
Porras worked in the offices of Senator Marco Rubio, then-Governor Rick Scott, and state representatives Juan Fernandez-Barquin and Spencer Roach. He was elected to the Florida House of Representatives in November 2022.

References 

Living people
Florida International University alumni
Republican Party members of the Florida House of Representatives
People from Miami-Dade County, Florida
1997 births
People from Miami
Politicians from Miami
21st-century American politicians
Hispanic and Latino American state legislators in Florida
American politicians of Cuban descent